Badakhal (बडाखाल), is a village in Jhapa District, on the north side of Itabhatta, between Vhirkuti and Dokandada in Nepal. It is the part of Mechinagar Municipality ward no.3. Previously, before Bahundangi VDC merged with Mechinagar Municipality, it was ward no.3 of Bahundangi Village Development Committee.

Populated places in Jhapa District